Sam Okuayinonu (born May 1, 1998) is an American football outside linebacker for the Tennessee Titans of the National Football League (NFL). He played college football at Maryland.

Early years
Sam Okuayinonu was a three-star recruit from Lowell, Massachusetts. He played defensive line for Lowell High School.

College career
On January 26, 2019, Okuayinonu committed to the Maryland Football. At Maryland, Okuayinonu had a total of 90 tackles, 12.0 tackles for loss and 5.5 sacks. After the events of the 2021 Pinstripe Bowl, Okuayinonu declared for the draft.

Professional career
Okuayinonu was not selected in the 2022 NFL Draft. On April 30, 2022, he signed with the Tennessee Titans as an undrafted free agent. He was waived on August 30, 2022 and signed to the practice squad the next day. He was promoted to the active roster on October 4. The Titans waived Okuayinonu on December 6, 2022 and re-signed with the practice squad. He was promoted to the active roster on December 29, then waived the next day and re-signed back to the practice squad. He signed a reserve/future contract on January 10, 2023.

References 

1998 births
Living people
American football defensive ends
Tennessee Titans players
Maryland Terrapins football players